(R)-amidase (R-stereospecific amidase, R-amidase) is an enzyme with systematic name (R)-piperazine-2-carboxamide amidohydrolase. This enzyme catalyses the following chemical reaction

 (1) (R)-piperazine-2-carboxamide + H2O  (R)-piperazine-2-carboxylic acid + NH3
 (2) beta-alaninamide + H2O  beta-alanine + NH3

This enzyme also hydrolyses (R)-piperidine-3-carboxamide to (R)-piperidine-3-carboxylic acid and NH3.

References

External links 
 

EC 3.5.1